Lizarba is a monotypic genus of South American dwarf sheet spiders containing the single species, Lizarba separata. It was first described by V. D. Roth in 1967, and has only been found in Brazil.

References

Hahniidae
Monotypic Araneomorphae genera
Spiders of Brazil